Mart Seim (born 24 October 1990) is an Estonian weightlifter competing in the +105 kg category.

Seim competed for Estonia at the 2014 World Weightlifting Championships finishing 4th with a total of 431 kg. At the 2015 World Weightlifting Championships he finished third at the men's +105 kg. After Aleksey Lovchev failed doping tests, Seim was promoted to second place (Silver), and Georgian Lasha Talakhadze to Gold.

Seim's father and grandfather were also weightlifters.

Major results

References

External links

1990 births
Living people
World Weightlifting Championships medalists
Estonian male weightlifters
Olympic weightlifters of Estonia
Weightlifters at the 2016 Summer Olympics
Sportspeople from Rakvere
European Weightlifting Championships medalists
21st-century Estonian people